Nephelolychnis is a genus of moths of the family Crambidae.

Species
Nephelolychnis ceadesalis (Walker, 1859)
Nephelolychnis velata Meyrick, 1933

References

Natural History Museum Lepidoptera genus database

Pyraustinae
Crambidae genera
Taxa named by Edward Meyrick